The Swiss Paralympic Committee is the National Paralympic Committee in Switzerland for the Paralympic Games movement. It is a non-profit organisation that selects teams, and raises funds to send Swiss competitors to Paralympic events organised by the International Paralympic Committee (IPC).

See also
Switzerland at the Paralympics

References

External links
Official website

Switzerland
Switzerland at the Paralympics
Paralympic
Disability organisations based in Switzerland